Flagy may refer to:
 Flagy, Haute-Saône, France
 Flagy, Saône-et-Loire, France
 Flagy, Seine-et-Marne, France